Witten is a city in North Rhine-Westphalia, Germany

Witten may also refer to:

Witten (surname)
Witten, Netherlands
Witten, South Dakota, United States
Witten Fork, a stream in Monroe County, Ohio, United States
 11349 Witten, a minor planet

See also
 Witten invariant (disambiguation)